Excavate may refer to:

Excavate or Excavata, a group of organisms
Excavate, to perform an excavation (archaeology)

See also
Excavation (disambiguation)
Digging